Kipkemei is a surname of Kenyan origin meaning "son of Kemei" that may refer to:

Wilson Kipkemei Busienei (born 1981), Kenyan long-distance runner and three-time gold medallist at the 2005 Summer Universiade
Richard Kipkemei Limo (born 1980), Kenyan long-distance runner and 2001 world champion
Stephen Tum Kipkemei (born 1986), Kenyan marathon runner and two-time winner of the Marrakech Marathon

See also
Kipkemoi, similar Kenyan name

Kalenjin names